Joseph Eudore Jean-Guy "Smitty" Gendron (August 30, 1934 – June 30, 2022) was a Canadian professional ice hockey left winger who played 863 games in the National Hockey League (NHL) for the New York Rangers, Boston Bruins, Montreal Canadiens and Philadelphia Flyers. Gendron scored his first NHL goal on November 9, 1955, for the New York Rangers in their 1–1 home tie versus the Montreal Canadiens.  He also played 127 games in the World Hockey Association (WHA) for the Quebec Nordiques, a team for which he was the head coach for two seasons.

Gendron played junior hockey with the Trois-Rivieres Reds before making his professional debut with the Providence Reds in 1954. He scored an NHL career high 24 goals in 1959–60 despite generally being called upon to play a hard-nosed, defensive-oriented role.

He died on June 30, 2022, through medical assistance in dying (MAID).

Career statistics

WHA coaching record

References

External links
 

1934 births
2022 deaths
2022 suicides
Boston Bruins players
Canadian ice hockey left wingers
French Quebecers
Ice hockey people from Montreal
Montreal Canadiens players
New York Rangers players
Philadelphia Flyers players
Providence Reds players
Quebec Aces (AHL) players
Quebec Nordiques (WHA) players
Quebec Nordiques coaches
Canadian ice hockey coaches
Deaths by euthanasia